The Château d'Alincourt is a historic château in Parnes, Oise, France. It was built in the 17th century. It has been listed as an official historical monument since 1944.

References

Houses completed in the 17th century
Châteaux in Oise
Monuments historiques of Hauts-de-France